Sur la piste des Dalton is a Lucky Luke comic written by Goscinny and Morris. It is the seventeenth title in the Lucky Luke series. The comic was printed by Dupuis in 1962 and by Cinebook in English in 2009 as On the Daltons' Trail.

Synopsis 
The Daltons escape. They are followed by Rintincan. After refusing to take charge of them again, Lucky Luke is forced to do so after they steal horses and a cow from a friend's house. Aided by Rintincan, he manages to catch up with them. In an unfortunate combination of circumstances and because of Rintincan, Luke is taken prisoner by the Daltons, who use it as a bargaining chip against the release of Joe Dalton, who had previously been arrested at Rightful Bend. Averell Dalton, who is fond of the dog, goes looking for it, which will be the cause of his capture as well as those of his brothers.

Characters 

 Rintincan: "The dumbest dog in the west".
 The Dalton brothers: Four nasty, stupid bandit brothers.

References

 Morris publications in Spirou BDoubliées

External links
 Lucky Luke official site album index 
Goscinny website on Lucky Luke

Comics by Morris (cartoonist)
Lucky Luke albums
1962 graphic novels
Works by René Goscinny